This is a list of the 6 districts of Belize by Human Development Index as of 2021.

See also

 List of countries by Human Development Index

References

Belize
Human Development Index
Districts Human Development Index